Vangueria pallidiflora is a species of flowering plant in the family Rubiaceae. It is endemic to Kenya and Tanzania.

References

External links 
 World Checklist of Rubiaceae

Flora of Kenya
Flora of Tanzania
pallidiflora
Taxonomy articles created by Polbot